This is a list of footballers who have played for Fluminense'''.

  Ademir
  
  Altair
  Assis
  Batatais
  Branco
  Carlos Alberto
  Carlos Alberto Torres
  Castilho
  Cláudio Adão
  Delei
  Didi
  Dirceu
  Doval
  Edinho
  Ézio
  Faustino Asprilla
  Felipe
  Félix
  Fernando
  Fred currently playing for  Cruzeiro
  Gérson
  Gil
  Henry Welfare
  Lula
  Magno Alves
  Manfrini
  Marcelo currently playing for  Real Madrid
  Marco Antônio
  Marinho Chagas
  Moacir Bastos
  Moisés
  Nilo
  Orlando Pingo de Ouro
  Pamplona
  Petković
  Preguinho
  Renato Gaúcho
  Ricardo Pinto
  Rivelino
  Roger (midfielder)
  Roger (defender)
  Romário
  Romerito
  Russo
  Telê Santana
  Tim
  Thiago Silva currently playing for  Chelsea FC
  Ulisses
  Valdo
  Washington

External links
  Idols at the club's Official Website
  Fluminense players in Brazil national football team

Fluminense
 
Association football player non-biographical articles